The Only Reason I Feel Secure is the second EP by Pedro the Lion. It was released on 17 May 1999 on Made in Mexico Records, and later reissued with three extra tracks on 16 October 2001 on Jade Tree Records. Tracks 6-8 — songs that originally constituted Pedro the Lion's first single — appear only on the Jade Tree reissue.

The EP's title was originally intended to be The Only Reason I Feel Secure Is That I Am Validated By My Peers. The cover artwork was by Ben Brubaker and the original release included a panel that extended the image to the right and contained the phrase "is that i am validated by my peers."

Personnel
 David Bazan — vocals, guitar
 Josh Golden — bass
 Ben Brubaker — drums
 Ben Brubaker — cover art

Track listing
 "Criticism as Inspiration" – 6:20
 "I Am Always the One Who Calls" – 3:41
 "Invention" – 4:44
 "Letter From a Concerned Follower" – 4:11
 "Be Thou My Vision" – 4:22
 "Big Trucks" (single version) – 2:58
 "Diamond Ring" – 3:22
 "Invention" (single version) – 5:08

All songs by David Bazan except for "Be Thou My Vision" (traditional)

Pedro the Lion albums
1999 EPs
Jade Tree (record label) EPs